Aries Kovoor (3 March 1927 – 1 December 2006) was a plant physiologist, who graduated from the University of Madras in 1945 and began working at the university's botanical research laboratories. In 1952, he was appointed Assistant Professor at the Sorbonne Laboratory. In 1969, he became a Professor of Plant Physiology and Director of the Laboratory "Physiologie de la Differenciation Cellulaire" at Faculty VII in Paris, where he held the professorial rank until his retirement in 1992. He was also Science Advisor to the President of the Democratic Socialist Republic of Sri Lanka, and he made significant contributions to tissue culture research in tropical plants, particularly in coconut. His efforts to improve scientific research in Sri Lanka included the establishment of the National Research Council of Sri Lanka.

Life and career 
Aries Kovoor was born on 3 March 1927 and is the son of A. T. Kovoor. He had his schooling in Jaffna and graduated from the University of Madras in 1945.

References

1927 births
2006 deaths